BFFs is a 2014 American comedy film directed by Andrew Putschoegl.  It stars Tara Karsian and Andrea Grano, both of whom also wrote the screenplay and co-produced it with Putschoegl. It serves as the final film role of Pat Carroll, who was Karsian's mother, as she passed away in 2022.

Plot
When two straight friends go into couples therapy, they're so convincing that even they start to question their relationship.

Cast
Tara Karsian as Kat
Andrea Grano as Samantha
Sigrid Thornton as Jacqueline
Patrick O'Connor as Bob
Jenny O'Hara as Suzie
Richard Moll as Ken
Sean Maher as J.K.
Russell Sams as Jonah
Larisa Oleynik as Chloe
Jeffrey Vincent Parise as Scott
Dan Gauthier as David
Molly Hagan as Rebecca
Eric Lively as Tom
Pat Carroll as Joan

References

External links
 
 

American comedy films
2010s English-language films
2010s American films